Ahmad Abu Matar (1944 - 2016) was a Palestinian academic and writer who often wrote on human rights issues.

References

1944 births
2016 deaths
Palestinian academics
Palestinian non-fiction writers
Palestinian emigrants to Norway